David Stuart Parker (March 22, 1919 – May 9, 1990) was a U.S. Army officer who served as the Governor of the Panama Canal Zone from 1971 to 1975.

Biography
He was born on March 22, 1919 at Fort Huachuca in Arizona to an Army officer, Roscoe Parker. He had a brother, Ambassador Richard Bordeaux Parker.

Parker was appointed to the United States Military Academy at West Point from Washington state and graduated with a B.S. degree in June 1940. He then served with the 19th Engineer Combat Regiment at Fort Ord, California until March 1942. Parker was assigned to the Engineer School at Fort Belvoir, Virginia from March 1942 to May 1944, graduating from the Field Officers Course in 1943. He commanded the 1299th Engineer Combat Battalion at Camp Bowie, Texas from June 1944 to January 1945. Parker was promoted to lieutenant colonel in January 1945.

In World War II, he served on the staff of Admiral Chester Nimitz and on the staff of General Douglas MacArthur in Tokyo, Japan as the chief of construction. In 1948, he returned to the United States and completed an M.S. degree in civil engineering from the University of California, Berkeley in June 1949. He married Betty Augur and they had as their children: David Parker and Bruce Parker of Washington, D.C.; Steven Parker of Fairbanks, Alaska; and a daughter, Anne  Parker Diggory of Saratoga Springs, New York.

Parker taught military topography at West Point from 1949 to 1952. He then served as military assistant to the governor of the Panama Canal Zone from 1952 to 1954. Parker was promoted to colonel in July 1955. He attended the United States Army War College from 1956 to 1957. Parker commanded the 36th Combat Engineering Group in South Korea from 1960 to 1961.

Parker was Lieutenant Governor of the Panama Canal Zone from 1963 to 1965. He was promoted to brigadier general in August 1965 and major general in September 1967. Parker served a tour in Vietnam commanding engineers from 1968 to 1969. He was Governor of the Panama Canal Zone from 1971 to 1975.

Parker died of congestive heart failure on May 9, 1990 at Marin General Hospital in Greenbrae, California. He was 71 years old, and had been living in Belvedere, California. Parker was interred at Arlington National Cemetery one week later.

References

External links

 Panama Canal Authority biography
 BillionGraves.com Headstone Record

1919 births
1990 deaths
People from Fort Huachuca, Arizona
United States Military Academy alumni
Military personnel from Washington (state)
United States Army Corps of Engineers personnel
United States Army personnel of World War II
American expatriates in Japan
Recipients of the Legion of Merit
UC Berkeley College of Engineering alumni
American civil engineers
United States Military Academy faculty
United States Army War College alumni
United States Army personnel of the Vietnam War
Recipients of the Air Medal
United States Army generals
Recipients of the Distinguished Service Medal (US Army)
Governors of the Panama Canal Zone
People from Belvedere, California
Burials at Arlington National Cemetery